Citizen Film is a San Francisco-based documentary company founded in 2002 by Sam Ball, Sophie Constantinou and Kate Stilley Steiner.

Documentaries 
They produce long-form documentary programs such as Joann Sfar Draws from Memory and Green Streets (in progress), and they have produced more than 100 short films. In addition, they provide key production and/or post-production services for independent producers such as Nancy Kates (Regarding Susan Sontag Regarding Susan Sontag); Vicki Abeles (Race to Nowhere); Tiffany Shlain (The Tribe); and Jenni Olson (575 Castro St.). They have produced several films with Academy Award winner Debra Chasnoff (A Foot in the Door and The Respect for All Project), promoting equity in education "at the earliest age possible and on an ongoing basis."

New Media 
Citizen Film also produces new media projects such as Lunch Love Community, co-directed by Constantinou and Helen DeMichiel; and Half-Remembered Stories, a collaboration with the San Francisco Jewish Film Festival.

References

External links 
Citizen Film Website

Cinema of the San Francisco Bay Area
Organizations based in San Francisco
Non-profit organizations based in California
Documentary film production companies
2002 establishments in California